The Party of Free Citizens leadership election of 2015 was held on 23 November 2015. The incumbent leader Petr Mach was reelected. 574 members of the party voted. Mach received 2 thirds of votes.

Petr Mach ran for reelection. Petr Hampl was considered his main rival. Hampl was considered far-right candidate. Hampl suggested prior voting that Mach might falsify the result. Other candidates included Roman Kříž and Miloslav Bednář. Mach won the election and Hampl came third. Hampl then left the party which pleased Mach.

Results

References

Svobodní leadership elections
Party of Free Citizens leadership election
Party of Free Citizens leadership election
Party of Free Citizens leadership election